The Miss Ecuador 1993 was held on April 22, 1993. There were 12 candidates for the national title. At the end of the night, Soledad Diab from Guayas crowned her successor Arianna Mandini from Guayas as Miss Ecuador 1993. The Miss Ecuador competed at Miss Universe 1992.

Results

Placements

Special awards

Contestants

Casting

A casting was held in 1993 to select an Ecuadorian representative to compete at Miss World 1993.

Notes

Returns

Last compete in:

1991
 Los Ríos

Withdraws

 Esmeraldas
 Imbabura
 Tungurahua

External links

Miss Ecuador
1993 beauty pageants
Beauty pageants in Ecuador
1993 in Ecuador